Edwin Soeryadjaya (born 17 July 1949) also known as Tjia Han Pun is a Chinese Indonesian businessman, He is the son of the late William Soeryadjaya, who founded automotive group Astra International. Soeryadjaya set up investment firm Saratoga Investama Sedaya in 1998. Today, through his private equity firm, PT Saratoga Investama Sedaya, he holds an ownership in coal miner Adaro Energy. He also has a stake in cell tower company Tower Bersama Infrastructure and bought Mandala Airlines in 2011 with his partner Sandiaga Uno.

Currently Edwin was known as the 12th richest people of Indonesia and the #913 in the world according to Forbes.

References

1949 births
Living people
People from Jakarta
Indonesian billionaires
Indonesian businesspeople
Indonesian people of Chinese descent
Indonesian Christians
Edwin